Astigmatina is a clade of mites in the superorder Acariformes. Astigmata has been ranked as an order or suborder in the past, but was lowered to the unranked clade Astigmatina of the clade Desmonomatides (synonym Desmonomata) in the order Sarcoptiformes. Astigmatina is now made up of the two groups Acaridia and Psoroptidia, which have been suborders of the order Astigmata in the past. Astigmatina contains about 10 superfamilies and 76 families under Acaridia and Psoroptidia.

Astigmatina belongs to the Sarcoptiformes, which contains the "biting" Acariformes. Many species are parasites of vertebrates. Most notorious among these are the Psoroptidia, which contain such notable taxa as feather mites and Sarcoptes scabiei.

Description 
Astigmatan mites are usually soft-bodied and white to brownish in colour (rarely tan and well-sclerotised), and range from 0.15 to 2.00 mm in length. They lack stigmatal openings (thus the name of the clade), peritremes or prodorsal sensilla. The gnathosoma (mouthparts) is usually exposed. They have a pair of chelicerae that are 2-segmented and usually chelate-dentate in shape (whip-like in Histiostomatidae). Opisthosomal glands are present and usually well-developed.

Some features vary depending on the life stage. Larvae have six legs (hexapod) whereas nymphs and adults have eight legs (octopod). The genital opening has one pair of genital papillae in the protonymph (first nymphal stage), but two pairs in the tritonymph (last nymphal stage) and adult.

Some astigmatans have a deutonymph stage which looks very different from other stages (heteromorphic). This is usually adapted for phoresy (attachment to a larger animal for transport), being well-sclerotised (to resist desiccation), with a reduced gnathosoma and a solid, non-functional foregut (as deutonymphs generally do not feed) and usually a posteroventral attachment organ. Some lineages have two possible types of heteromorphic deutonymph, with the other being sac-like and immobile (immobile heteromorphic deutonymph). The purpose of this deutonymph type is to survive environmental stresses for long periods of time.

Males have an aedeagus in a usually postcoxal position. Females have a secondary sperm-receiving structure with a bursa copulatrix.

Ecology 
Unlike their oribatid ancestors, which are mostly restricted to soil, the Astigmatina show a wide range of ecological strategies. The Histiostomatoidea live in various wet substrates such as decaying plant tissue, dung, mud and tree holes, and feed on organic material. The Glycyphagoidea live in mammal nests, human houses and stored foods. The Pyroglyphoidea live in houses as house dust mites. Many Acaroidea live in stored foods, but the superfamily also includes plant pests and inhabitants of vertebrate or insect nests. The majority of Hemisarcoptoidea are kleptoparasites. The Canestrinoidea are parasites feeding on exudates of beetles. The also-parasitic Sarcoptoidea live in mammal fur and skin. Several superfamilies are exclusively associated with birds (Pterolichoidea, Freyanoidea and Analgoidea) or bird nests (Hypoderatoidea).

Among the mites occurring in soil, Astigmatina is the least common group, though they may be common in some habitats. Their populations in agricultural soils increase after harvesting or the application of rich manures. Most soil-dwelling Astigmatina are microbe feeders, though the species with chelate chelicerae can chew on vegetable material, fungi and algae.

Several astigmatan families are obligate associates of bees, which feed within bee nests. The genus Chaetodactylus can form both phoretic deutonymphs (to disperse to new nests on adult bees) and immobile deutonymphs (to survive in old nests so they can infest bees that reuse nests).

Economic importance 
Astigmatina in homes damage stored products, disperse microbial propagules and contribute to allergic reactions. The parasitic species cause diseases such as scabies and mange. A few acarid species are minor pests of seedling crops.

There are also beneficial species of Astigmatina. Hemisarcoptes (Hemisarcoptidae) are parasites of armoured scale insects, which are plant pests.

Taxonomy 
Astigmatina contains about 11 superfamilies with thousands of genera, as follows:

Acaridia (> 400 genera, > 1300 species)

 Schizoglyphoidea (2 genera, 2 species)
 Schizoglyphidae
 Histiostomatoidea (c. 60 genera, > 200 species)
 Histiostomatidae
 Guanolichidae
 Canestrinioidea (> 100 genera, > 300 species)
 Chetochelacaridae
 Lophonotacaridae
 Canestriniidae
 Heterocoptidae
 Hemisarcoptoidea (50 genera, > 200 species)
 Chaetodactylidae
 Hyadesiidae
 Carpoglyphidae
 Algophagidae
 Hemisarcoptidae
 Winterschmidtiidae
 Glycyphagoidea (> 70 genera, > 150 species)
 Euglycyphagidae
 Chortoglyphidae
 Pedetropodidae
 Echimyopodidae
 Aeroglyphidae
 Rosensteiniidae
 Glycyphagidae
 Acaroidea (> 120 genera, > 500 species)
 Sapracaridae
 Suidasiidae
 Lardoglyphidae
 Glycacaridae
 Gaudiellidae
 Acaridae (> 110 genera, > 400 species)
 Hypoderoidea
 Hypoderidae

Psoroptidia (> 600 genera, > 2,000 species)

 Pterolichoidea (> 200 genera, > 500 species)
 Oconnoriidae
 Ptiloxenidae
 Pterolichidae (> 100 genera, c. 300 species)
 Cheylabididae
 Ochrolichidae
 Gabuciniidae
 Falculiferidae
 Eustathiidae
 Crypturoptidae
 Thoracosathesidae
 Rectijanuidae
 Ascouracaridae
 Syringobiidae
 Kiwilichidae
 Kramerellidae
 Freyanoidea (> 30 genera, c. 50 species)
 Freyanidae
 Vexillariidae
 Caudiferidae
 Analgoidea (> 200 genera, c. 700 species)
 Heteropsoridae
 Analgidae
 Xolalgidae
 Avenzoariidae
 Pteronyssidae
 Proctophyllodidae
 Psoroptoididae
 Trouessartiidae
 Alloptidae
 Thysanocercidae
 Dermationidae
 Epidermoptidae
 Apionacaridae
 Dermoglyphidae
 Laminosioptidae
 Knemidokoptidae
 Cytoditidae
 Pyroglyphoidea (26 genera, > 50 species)
 Pyroglyphidae
 Turbinoptidae
 Psoroptoidea (c. 160 genera, > 600 species)
 Psoroptidae
 Galagalgidae
 Lobalgidae
 Myocoptidae
 Rhyncoptidae
 Audycoptidae
 Listrophoridae
 Chirodiscidae
 Atopomelidae
 Chirorhynchobiidae
 Gastronyssidae
 Lemurnyssidae
 Pneumocoptidae
 Sarcoptidae
 incertae sedis (16 genera, 17 species)
 Ptyssalgidae
 Ptyssalges major (Trouessart, 1887)
 Psoralgidae

incertae sedis

Troglotacaridae
 Troglotacarus hauseri Fain, 1977

References

Sarcoptiformes